Karl Emil August Rasche (23 August 1892 – 13 September 1951) was an SS-Obersturmbannführer and a Ph.D. in law as well as a board member and banker, later spokesman, of the Dresdner Bank during the Third Reich. On 11 April 1949 he was sentenced in a Ministries Trial to seven years in prison for his activities under the Nazis.

Biography

Early career 
Rasche studied economics and law in Münster, Munich, Leipzig, Berlin, and Bonn. At the outbreak of the First World War, he joined the army and fought on the Western Front. After being wounded in 1917 he wrote a dissertation with the title "The police concept in today's Prussian law with special attention to special laws" whilst in hospital. After the war he became involved in the Baltische Landeswehr, fundraising and recruiting volunteers. From July 1919 Rasche served as a court clerk in Hamm, but moved in 1921 to work at the Barmer Bank Corporation, where he became a rehabilitation specialist. From the beginning of 1933 he was a board member of the Bochum Westfalenbank AG, where he  worked with Paul Pleiger.

During the Nazi period 
In 1934 Rasche was appointed a deputy, and from August 1935, a full board member of the Dresdner Bank. His employment with Dresdner Bank had partly come through the intervention of Wilhelm Keppler. Together with another board member, Emil Heinrich Meyer, Rasche was considered a trusted banker of the SS. Though Rasche joined the Nazi Party in May 1933, his membership was not considered valid, as no membership card was issued or any membership fees paid. In August 1939 Rasche was retroactively awarded party membership from May 1937 and was given membership number 2,207,508. From 1933, Rasche was also a member of the German Labor Front (DAF), the Rechtswahrerbund (Lawyer's association), and the Nationalsozialistischer Reichsbund für Leibesübungen, the umbrella organisation for sports. During the 1936 Summer Olympics Rasche was deputy head of the Reich Office for professional athletics. Because of this role, he was introduced as a guest of honour to Adolf Hitler, the leader of the Nazi Party, and was introduced into the  Freundeskreis Himmler by Fritz Kranefuss in the autumn of 1936. Rasche joined the SS (membership number 323,879) in May 1939 with membership retroactive to November 1938 as a Hauptsturmführer (SS Captain). After the Anschluss of Austria in 1938, Rasche became involved in the expansion of the banking business in Austria and later in the Sudetenland and Protectorate of Bohemia and Moravia. From the mid-1930s, he served as Chairman or Board member in the war effort and also led the business departments of the subsidiaries Handelstrust West NV (Amsterdam) and  Continentale Bank SA (Brussels).

In December 1943, he joined the Executive Group West in Bad Nauheim.

Rasche was involved in the negotiation of credit to the SS, which operated Nazi forced labor camps and concentration camps and financed the Germanisation programmes in occupied Eastern Europe. In banking, Rasche was also involved in Aryanization in the Netherlands and the Protectorate of Bohemia and Moravia.

After the war 

In April 1945 Rasche was arrested at Bad Nauheim and was placed in French captivity. He was questioned in Paris. Rasche was confined to the French occupation zone and his activity was limited to the "promotion of cross-border economic relations" for the French military government. In November 1945 Rasche was appointed to exchange information with the Office of Military Government, United States investigators in the American occupation zone. He was arrested immediately after his arrival in Frankfurt. He was imprisoned in Darmstadt after a stay in the prison in Frankfurt and in the 74th Ludwigsburg camp. From there he was transferred to the Dachau concentration camp, and finally was called to trial in April 1947 in the Nuremberg Trials.

As the only banker on trial from the private sector, Rasche was indicted on 4 November 1947 at the Ministries Trial, the eleventh set of trials to take place under the Nuremberg Trials.

Regarding the seventh indictment of collaborating in slave labour, the prosecution could not prove conclusively whether Rasche had visited concentration camps or taken loans to pay for their building.

Rasche was released (early) in August 1950 from the Landsberg Prison for war criminals. In October/November 1950 Rasche was declared to have completed the denazification process. He was unable to resume work at the Dresdner Bank. In May 1951 representatives of the Bank agreed on a settlement for compensation and pension claims. Rasche continued working as a consultant and died as a result of a heart attack on a commuter train to Basel in September 1951.

Work in supervisory boards 

Chairman of the Supervisory Board
 1938–1945: Perlmooser Cement AG, Vienna
 1939–1944: Bohemian Escompte Bank, Prague (banking subsidiary Dresdner Bank)
 1939–1944: Poldi Hütte AG, Prague
 1941–1945: Commercial Credit Bank Ltd., Riga
 1943–1945: West German Bodenkreditanstalt, Cologne
 1943–1945: Tatra Werke AG, Prague
 Engelhardt-Brauerei AG Brewery, Berlin
 Hardy & Co. Ltd. Bank, Berlin

Vice-Chairman of the Supervisory Board
 1944 Allgemeine Versicherungs AG, Vienna
 1936–1945: Dyckerhoff Portland Cement AG, Mainz-Amöneburg
 1939–1945: Rheinische rayon AG, Krefeld

Member of the Supervisory Board
 1936–1945: Mülheim mining association
 1936–1939: Junkers aircraft and engine plants AG
 1937–1945: Winter Hall AG, Kassel
 1937–1945: GEA Group AG, Frankfurt
 1938–1944: Gerling Group Life Insurance AG, Cologne
 1938–1945: Felten & Guillaume AG, Cologne
 1938–1945: Coal AG of Essen, Essen
 1938–1945: Country Bank Wien AG (subsidiary of Dresdner Bank)
 1938–1945: Iron and Steelworks AG, Cologne-Beckum
 1939–1945: Accumulatoren Factory AG, Hagen
 1939–1945: Brno Arms Factory AG, Prague
 1939–1944: Döhrener Werke AG, Hannover
 1940–1944: Coal-Benzin AG (Brabag), Berlin
 1940–1945: Continental Oil AG, Berlin
 1940–1945: Škoda Works AG, Hanover
 1940–1945: Rheinmetall AG, Düsseldorf

1892 births
1951 deaths
People from Iserlohn
German bankers
SS-Obersturmbannführer
Nazi Party politicians
German Army personnel of World War I
Jurists from North Rhine-Westphalia
People convicted by the United States Nuremberg Military Tribunals
People from the Province of Westphalia
Lawyers in the Nazi Party
20th-century Freikorps personnel
Dresdner Bank